Sucharit Sarkar (born 1983) is an Indian topologist and professor of mathematics at the University of California, Los Angeles who works in low-dimensional topology.

Education and career
Sarkar attended secondary school at South Point High School in his hometown, Calcutta, India. In the International Mathematical Olympiads in 2001 and 2002, he received gold and silver medals respectively.  He completed his Bachelor of Mathematics degree from the Indian Statistical Institute, Bangalore in 2005.

Sarkar received his Ph.D. from Princeton University in 2009 under the guidance of Zoltán Szabó.  He went on to postdoctoral fellowships at the Mathematical Sciences Research Institute and Columbia University, before becoming an assistant professor at Princeton University in 2012.  In 2016 he moved to the University of California, Los Angeles.

Sarkar's research area is low-dimensional topology, with particular interests in knot theory, Heegaard Floer homology, and Khovanov homology.

Awards and honors
  Sarkar was an invited speaker at the International Congress of Mathematicians in Rio de Janeiro in 2018.
  Sarkar was a Clay Research Fellow from 2009 until 2013.

References

External links

21st-century Indian mathematicians
Indian topologists
1983 births
Living people
Princeton University alumni
University of California, Los Angeles faculty
Scientists from Kolkata
International Mathematical Olympiad participants
Indian Statistical Institute alumni
Indian expatriate academics
Indian expatriates in the United States
Princeton University faculty
Expatriate academics in the United States
American people of Indian descent
Scientists from West Bengal